Bozalan can refer to the following villages in Turkey:

 Bozalan, Bozüyük
 Bozalan, Buldan
 Bozalan, Ezine
 Bozalan, Savaştepe